Cidlina is a river in the Czech Republic, draining south from its source in Tábor hill near Lomnice nad Popelkou through Jičín, Nový Bydžov and Chlumec nad Cidlinou, merging with the Elbe at Libice nad Cidlinou. Cidlina is 87.3 kilometres long, its drainage area covers 1,164 km2 and average discharge is 4.66 m³/s.

References

Rivers of the Hradec Králové Region
Rivers of the Central Bohemian Region
Rivers of the Liberec Region